"O Heiland, reiß die Himmel auf" (O Saviour, tear open the heavens) is a Christian Advent song. The text was first printed in 1622, attributed to Friedrich Spee; the melody was first printed in 1666.

History 
The song was first published in Würzburg in the collection Das Allerschönste Kind in der Welt (The most beautiful child in the world). Its author is not named, but is thought to be Friedrich Spee, due to similarities to his later collection Trutznachtigall. The text was written in the context of the Thirty Years War, the plague and witch trials. The text was first sung to the melody of "Conditor alma siderum". The melody known today appeared first in the Rheinfelsisches Gesangbuch of 1666.

The song is focused on the longing for the arrival of a Saviour. It has been included in both Catholic and Protestant hymnals; in Protestant hymnals sometimes with an added seventh stanza of unknown authorship.

Theme and text 
The song is based on a verse in the Book of Isaiah, in the Latin text from the Vulgate that the author knew "Rorate coeli de super, et nubes pluant justum: aperiatur terra, et germinet Salvatorem" which was set in the Gregorian chant Rorate caeli. The beginning is related to another verse by Isaiah: "Ach dass du den Himmel zerrissest und führest herab, dass die Berge vor dir zerflössen"  From the fourth stanza on, the believers appear as a "we" (wir), describing the miserable conditions that need to change.

Added later and first appeared in David Gregor Corner's collection in 1631:

Melody and settings 

The melody in Dorian mode appears first in the Rheinfelsisches Gesangbuch of 1666. It may have been composed especially for the text.

The hymn was set to music by composers such as Johannes Brahms, Johann Nepomuk David, Hugo Distler and Johannes Weyrauch. Richard Wetz used it in his .

Literature 
 Michael Fischer: "O JESV mein du schöner Held". Das Motiv von der Schönheit Christi im 17. Jahrhundert. In: Spee-Jahrbuch. Arbeitsgemeinschaft der Friedrich-Spee-Gesellschaften Düsseldorf und Trier 13 (2006), pp. 145–158 (online, PDF, 416 KB).
  (2010) Kirchenlied und Kultur. Studien und Standortbestimmungen. Tübingen:Francke. , pp. 210 ff..
 Joachim Pritzkat: O Heiland, reiß die Himmel auf. Zur 374jährigen Geschichte eines Liedes von Friedrich von Spee. In: Hermann Kurzke, Hermann Ühlein (ed.): Kirchenlied interdisziplinär: Hymnologische Beiträge aus Germanistik, Theologie und Musikwissenschaft. 2nd edition. Peter Lang, Frankfurt a.M. 2002, pp. 131–172.
 Joachim Pritzkat: Wo bleibstu Trost der gantzen Welt? Zur Spannung zwischen Diesseitsangst und Jenseitshoffnung bei Friedrich von Spee und Andreas Gryphius. In: Spee-Jahrbuch 5 (1998), pp. 107–116 (historicum.net).

References

External links 

 
 
 
 

17th-century hymns in German
Advent songs